The present Indian state of Maharashtra came into existence on 1 May 1960. The number of constituencies of the first Maharashtra Vidhan Sabha, the lower house of the Maharashtra state legislature in 1960 was 264. 33 constituencies were reserved for the candidates belonging to the Scheduled castes and 14 were reserved for the candidates belonging to the Scheduled tribes.

List of current constituencies (since 2008) 
Following is the list of the constituencies of the Maharashtra Vidhan Sabha since the delimitation of legislative assembly constituencies in 2008. At present, 29 constituencies are reserved for the candidates belonging to the Scheduled castes and 25 are reserved for the candidates belonging to the Scheduled tribes:

List of former constituencies (made defunct by 2008) 
Following is the list of the constituencies of the Maharashtra Vidhan Sabha since the delimitation of legislative assembly constituencies in 2008. At present, 29 constituencies are reserved for the candidates belonging to the Scheduled castes and 25 are reserved for the candidates belonging to the Scheduled tribes:

See also
 Maharashtra Vidhan Sabha

Notes

Constituencies of Maharashtra Assembly

Maharashtra Vidhan Sabha